Bazmiyan (also Romanized as Bazmiyan, Baz Meyān, and Baz Mīān) is a village in Rahmat Rural District, Seyyedan District, Marvdasht County, Fars Province, Iran. At the 2006 census, its population was 693, in 173 families.

References 

Populated places in Marvdasht County